The UEFA European Championship qualifying, branded as the European Qualifiers, is the process that UEFA-affiliated national football teams go through in order to qualify for the UEFA European Championship.

In this article, the years represent the final tournaments of the European Championship, and are not meant to correspond to the actual dates when the qualification matches were played.

Format evolution

Resume

The 1960 and 1964 qualifications were knock-out tournaments. The four quarter-final-winning teams qualified for the final stages, and one of them was chosen to host the competition.

From 1968 onwards, a group stage began to be used as the main, or sole, component of qualification. In 1968, 1972 and 1976, the winners of the eight groups advanced to a quarter-final stage, which was still part of the qualifying. The four quarter-final winners progressed to the finals. Again, the host nation was selected among the four finalists.

From 1980, the hosting rights would be assigned in advance, and the host teams would be guaranteed automatic qualification. The format of the finals was expanded to feature 8 teams. Winners of qualifying groups now proceeded to the finals directly. The 1980, 1984, 1988 and 1992 qualifications included seven groups, the winners of which would join the hosts in the finals, although in 1992 one winner was eventually banned from appearing and was replaced by the runner-up of its group.

From 1996, a 16-team format was employed for the main tournament. Runners-up in qualifying groups now could also gain access to the finals. Play-off pairings were introduced as a second opportunity for teams that narrowly miss out direct qualification. The 1996 qualifying consisted of eight groups; the group winners as well as the six best runners-up qualified, and so did the winner of the play-off between the remaining two runners-up, joining the host country.

In 2000, the first-placed teams in the nine qualifying groups as well as the best runner-up progressed directly to the finals, while another four spots were taken by winners of play-offs contested by the remaining runners-up. For the first time there were two host countries; they both received automatic berths in the finals.

In 2004, along with the host team, the ten qualifying group winners advanced, as did the winners of the five play-off ties formed by the runners-up.

In 2008, the top two teams from each of the seven qualifying groups joined the two host teams to bring the number of finalists to 16. No play-off stage was held.

The 2012 qualification replicated the format of that of 2000: places were taken by nine group winners and the best runner-up, while the other runners-up determined four more finalists via play-offs, with the two host countries qualifying by default.

Starting from 2016, the finals format was expanded again, now featuring 24 teams. It became possible for third-placed teams in qualifying groups to get to the Euros too. The 2016 qualifying included nine groups; the winners, the runners-up, and the best third-placed team advanced directly, while play-offs played by the other third-placed teams determined the last four finalists. The host nation still qualified automatically. The 2016 qualification tournament was the first one to be branded as the European Qualifiers, a trademark used from that point on for both the European Championship qualifications and the FIFA World Cup qualification tournaments in Europe.

From 2020, qualification began to be linked with the newly created UEFA Nations League: participation in the qualifying play-offs was now determined based on the teams' performances in that competition and not in qualification itself. The play-offs themselves were restructured into four-team brackets consisting of semi-finals and a final. In the 2020 qualifying, the top two teams of the ten qualifying groups took twenty places in the main tournament. From each of the four divisions of the 2018–19 Nations League, the four best-ranked teams not already qualified for Euro 2020 filled in a play-off bracket for that division, and the winner of each bracket got a spot in the Euros too. There were no automatic berths for Euro 2020 as it was hosted by multiple cities across the continent. It was actually postponed to 2021 due to the COVID-19 pandemic but retained its original branding.

In a similar fashion, the 2024 qualifying will grant spots to the winners and runners-up of the ten qualifying groups, while this time only the top three divisions of the 2022–23 Nations League will form play-off brackets to determine three more finalists, and the host country will get an automatic spot.

For 2028, the number of groups will be increased to twelve. The winners will advance to the finals, while the runners-up will either also advance directly or participate in play-offs. The number of host nations, which will qualify by default, is to be determined.

Participating teams
All national teams that are members of UEFA are eligible to enter the qualification for the European Championship. A total of 56 distinct entities have made attempts to qualify for the European Championship. Of those, 55 are still active in the competition. Due to political changes, a few of the entities have appeared under multiple incarnations (see the footnotes to the below table), and the East Germany team is now defunct.

Saarland, a former UEFA member, merged into West Germany in 1957 and therefore did not enter the qualifiers of any European Championships.

Successor teams inheriting the records of former teams (as considered by UEFA and FIFA)

Teams competing as parts of other teams

Renamed teams

Overview

Key
 = successful qualifying campaign
 = did not take part in qualifying
 = participated in the final tournament

Team records
The below table compares the overall records of all teams that have participated in qualification. Teams are ordered by points using the three points for a win system, then by goal difference, and then by goals scored. Note that this order does not represent any official rankings, and qualification tournaments are not direct competitions between all teams.

The "Qualifying attempts" column only counts qualifying campaigns where the team played at least one match, while the "Appearances in the finals" also include automatic qualifiers.

As per statistical convention in football, matches decided in extra time are counted as wins and losses, while matches decided by penalty shoot-outs are counted as draws.

The table is accurate as of UEFA Euro 2020.

Notes on the table:
 The 1992 qualifying attempt is treated as successful for Yugoslavia and unsuccessful for Denmark, even though Yugoslavia did not appear in the 1992 finals while Denmark did.
 The Austria vs Greece match (1968 qualifying), which was declared void, is not taken into account.
 For the following matches, which were annulled and then replayed, only the replays are counted: Netherlands vs Cyprus (1988 qualifying) and Georgia vs Russia (2004 qualifying).
 For the following matches, where the scorelines were awarded, the awarded scorelines, rather than the original ones, are taken into account: Denmark vs Sweden (2008 qualifying), Italy vs Serbia (2012 qualifying), Serbia vs Albania (2016 qualifying), and Montenegro vs Russia (2016 qualifying).
 In the 2016 qualifying, Serbia was deducted 3 points and Croatia was deducted 1 point, which is reflected in the table.

Notes

References

External links

 European Championship, RSSSF

See also
 National team appearances in the UEFA European Championship
 FIFA World Cup qualification
 AFC Asian Cup qualification
 CONCACAF Gold Cup qualification

 
qualifying